Francis Arthur O'Keefe (October 1856 – 21 April 1909) was an Irish politician.

Educated at Clongowes Wood College and Trinity College Dublin, he became a solicitor. For three successive  years he was Mayor of Limerick. Elected in a by-election in 1888, he sat as Member of Parliament for Limerick City until the general election of 1895, and after another by-election in 1895, until 1900.

References

External links 

1856 births
1909 deaths
Members of the Parliament of the United Kingdom for County Limerick constituencies (1801–1922)
Irish Parliamentary Party MPs
UK MPs 1886–1892
UK MPs 1892–1895
UK MPs 1895–1900
People educated at Clongowes Wood College
Alumni of Trinity College Dublin
Mayors of Limerick (city)
Anti-Parnellite MPs